Teddy Gross (Theodore Faro Gross) (born 1949) is the founder (1991) and executive director of Common Cents, a national not-for-profit educational organization, which specializes in designing citizenship programs for children and young people, and supporting their work in schools throughout America. Common Cents organizes The Penny Harvest, which has become the largest child-philanthropy program in the United States.

Plays for the Theatre
Red Square, Seattle Repertory Theatre. Daniel Sullivan, director, 1987.
Crossfire. Off Broadway, Double Image Theatre. Max Mayer, director, 1984; Denver Theatre Center, 1984; Center Stage, Baltimore, 1983; New Voices Series, Seattle Repertory Theatre, 1983; Virginia Stage, summer residency, 1983.
Lost & Found: A Play for Children. Commissioned by Santa Fe Theatre Festival, 1981; Berkshire Theatre Festival, 1983; productions in translation in Frankfurt, Sttutgart, Esslingen, Vienna elsewhere.
Fire at luna park. Magic Theatre, San Francisco. 1982; published in Kenyon Review, 1983.
Eugene O'Neill National Playwrights Conference, 1979,1981.

Book and Recordings for Children

Everyone asked about you. Putnam & Grosset, NY, 1990; Macmillan paperback, 1993.
Sing me a story, Bob McGrath songs. Video Treasures. 1995.

References

External links 
 Common Cents Staff

Living people
1949 births